Mount Shahdagh is a mountain peak of the Greater Caucasus range, located in the Qusar District of Azerbaijan, close to the border with Russia.

Among the earth rocks found in Shahdagh are magnesian lime, chalkstone and marble. Winter temperatures at Shahdagh average -20°C.

See also
Shahdagh National Park
Shahdagh Mountain Resort

References

External links

 Images of Mount Shahdagh on freemanentropy.com

Four-thousanders of the Caucasus
Mountains of Azerbaijan
+
Lists of coordinates
Geography of the Caucasus
Geography of Azerbaijan